Maria Kuznetsova or Mariya Kuznetsova may refer to:

 Maria Kuznetsova (novelist), Ukrainian American novelist
 Maria Kuznetsova (wrestler) (born 1997), Russian wrestler
 Mariya Kuznetsova (born 1950), Russian actress in the 2001 film Taurus
 Mariya Kuznetsova (singer) (1880–1966), Russian opera singer and dancer
 Mariya Kuznetsova (pilot) (1918–1990), Soviet fighter pilot

See also
 Maria Kouznetsova (violinist) (born 1991), Russian violinist